Temecula Valley High School, known by locals as TV, is a public high school for grades 9 to 12 in Temecula, California. The school opened in 1985 as the city's first high school. When it was built, it was a part of the Elsinore Union High School District (now the Lake Elsinore Unified School District) until the Temecula Valley Unified School District was founded. It is a California Distinguished School.

In its first year, the school's attendance consisted of 350 students and 17 teachers. Over the years, attendance has increased to over 3,000.

In order to keep up with increasing enrollment, the school has undergone several changes. In August 2007, Temecula Valley High opened a new multimillion-dollar gym. In May 2013, Temecula Valley High School completed a multimillion-dollar performing arts center. In February 2015, a renovation of the Stadium was completed, changing the field to turf rather than grass.

Athletics 
The Temecula Valley's wrestling team won its 31st consecutive league title in 2019, and has won 36 CIF titles, and 3 Masters titles.

Temecula Valley High's football program had a record 12 straight CIF playoff appearances from 1995-2007.

In 2016, Temecula Valley High School's varsity basketball team reached the CIF championship for the first time.

Notable alumni

Nicole Aniston - Adult actress
Christy Hemme- Wwe Diva 
Shannon Messenger - Author
Brooks Pounders - Baseball player
Matt Rosser - Basketball player
Justin Simon - Basketball player
Taylor Tomlinson - Comedian
Kelsie Whitmore - professional baseball player

References

External links
 
 

High schools in Riverside County, California
Public high schools in California
Temecula, California
1985 establishments in California
Educational institutions established in 1985